Mrkonjić Grad is a town and municipality located in the western part of Republika Srpska, an entity of Bosnia and Herzegovina. It is located in the region of Bosanska Krajina, between Banja Luka and Jajce. As of 2013, the municipality has a population of 16,671 inhabitants, while the town of Mrkonjić Grad has a population of 7,915 inhabitants.

Name
The town changed its name several times in history: Gornje Kloke, Novo Jajce, Varcarev Vakuf, Varcar Vakuf, and ultimately the present one. The last renaming took place in 1924 after King Peter I of Serbia, who had taken the nom de guerre "Mrkonjić" while fighting in the uprising (1875–78) against the Ottoman Empire.

History
From 1929 to 1941, Mrkonjić Grad was part of the Vrbas Banovina of the Kingdom of Yugoslavia.

In World War II, the town became renowned by the first meeting of ZAVNOBiH on 25 November 1943, when Bosnia and Herzegovina was proclaimed as a common republic of Serbs, Croats and Muslims.

During the Bosnian War from 1992 to 1995, the town was within the territory controlled by ethnic Serbs. The town is also known for the Mrkonjić Grad incident where the USAF lost one F-16 in June 1995. The pilot of the jet, Scott O'Grady, was stranded in the area for six days before being rescued by US Marines. In 8–12 October 1995, Mrkonjić Grad was in the hands of the Croatian Army (HV) and the Croatian Defence Council (HVO).

After the Dayton peace agreement the town was assigned to the entity of Republika Srpska. In 1996, a mass grave containing the bodies of 181 Serbs—mostly civilians—was uncovered in Mrkonjić Grad. Almost all were killed by Croat forces in late 1995.

Demographics

Population

Ethnic composition

Economy

The following table gives a preview of total number of registered employed people per their core activity (as of 2016):

Tourism
The Balkana Lake lies near the town and presents a small, but beautiful tourist resort including the nearby Skakavac Waterfall.

See also
 Mrkonjić Grad incident

References

External links

Municipality of Mrkonjić Grad
Mrkonjić Grad Guide
Mrkonjić Grad - Internet - Live & Exclusive from MG
Mrkonjić Grad Portal
Zelenkovac Art gallery

 
Populated places in Mrkonjić Grad
Cities and towns in Republika Srpska